Philippe Mahoux (born 26 June 1944), is a Belgian politician and a member of the Parti Socialiste. He was elected as a member of the Belgian Senate in 1990.

Notes

1944 births
Living people
Members of the Senate (Belgium)
Socialist Party (Belgium) politicians
People from Ciney
Vice-presidents of the Senate (Belgium)
21st-century Belgian politicians